The Piemonte Open was a golf tournament on the Challenge Tour, played near Turin, in the Piedmont region of Italy. It was held in 2008 and 2009.

Winners

External links
Coverage on the Challenge Tour's official site

Former Challenge Tour events
Golf tournaments in Italy
Sport in Turin